Light Magic was a parade/street show that ran at Disneyland from May–September 1997. It was billed as a replacement for the Main Street Electrical Parade. At the time of Light Magic's closure, Disney officially stated that it would return in 2000, but it ultimately did not return. Infrastructure improvements made specifically for Light Magic – particularly in Fantasyland – are still used today. The show utilized over 4500 miles of fiber optic cables, and 1520 strobe lights.

Synopsis
Light Magic was a "streetacular" (a portmanteau of "street" and "spectacular"). Floats moved into two performance zones, one located at the Small World Mall in Fantasyland, and the other on Main Street. Upon reaching the performance zones, the floats stopped and the pixie characters, who were the focus of the show, awakened and performed step-dancing routines for the audience, and were then joined by Disney characters. During the performance segment, a portion of each of the floats revealed a screen upon which images were projected from equipment hidden in the surrounding buildings. As part of the grand finale, the fairies used their 'magic' to throw pixie dust, confetti falls from the sky and the buildings light up with a shower of twinkling lights provided by fiber optics embedded in the structures.

Light Magic's music was Celtic-influenced. The songs in the show were:

 "Dream Our Dream", the Light Magic Theme
 "Little April Shower" from Bambi
 "Be Our Guest" from Beauty and the Beast  
 "Topsy Turvy (song)" from The Hunchback of Notre Dame
 "Step in Time" from Mary Poppins   
 "When You Wish upon a Star" from Pinocchio   
 "A Dream Is a Wish Your Heart Makes" from Cinderella    
 "Part of Your World" from The Little Mermaid  
 "Beauty and the Beast" from Beauty and the Beast
 "Baroque Hoedown" from the Main Street Electrical Parade

Reception

Annual Passholder premiere
Light Magic made its debut on May 13, 1997 at a private event for Disneyland Annual Passholders. The premiere night did not go well as technical problems came up with aligning the floats with the projectors, various cues were missed, and sound equipment failed, as well as the fiber-optic lighting not yet being functional. The initial show was prefaced by then-Disneyland President Paul Pressler announcing to the crowd that the show was to be a dress rehearsal and not the show in its finished form.

The passholders' response to Light Magic was negative, with long lines extending from Guest Relations at City Hall on Main Street demanding refunds, as passholders had paid $25 each to attend the special event under the impression, based on all of the information that had been distributed, that they would be the first to see the official premiere, not a dress rehearsal.

General public response
Light Magic debuted to the general public on May 23, 1997 and played until September 1 of that year, with the majority of the response from the public ranging from lackluster to dislike.

Legacy
Much of the infrastructure built for Light Magic – especially in the Fantasyland area – is still used for Disneyland's parades today. These infrastructure improvements included:
 Painted asphalt along the parade route was replaced with concrete to accommodate the large, heavy show platforms  
 The plaza area in front of It's a Small World was widened and terraced to allow more guests a better view of the parade route, similar to the way some areas of New Orleans Square were terraced for Fantasmic!.
 A walkway was added parallel to the parade route between Storybook Land Canal Boats and It's A Small World – landscaped to block the view of the parade route from the walkway – in order to allow guests to move in and out of the It's A Small World area during parades. This was added in response to crowded conditions for guests during the final months of the Main Street Electrical Parade's run.
 Lighting towers constructed for Light Magic on Small World Mall and atop the Main Street, U.S.A. buildings allowed Disneyland to run the same parade in the afternoon and in the evening, rather than running separate afternoon and evening parades as was done for several years of the Main Street Electrical Parade's run, such as The Lion King Celebration.

Three towers constructed on Small World Mall for sound and lighting technician use in Light Magic are still standing. Two currently serve no explicit purpose, but their exterior facades are maintained. One has been returned to service as a projection tower for the park's fireworks shows.

In March 17th, 2013. Light Magic Music is also use in Disneyland Paris Saint Patrick's Fireworks.

Another spiritual successor to the Main Street Electrical Parade, the Paint the Night Parade, which also makes use of "Baroque Hoedown", premiered at Disneyland on May 22, 2015, as part of the park's 60th anniversary celebration.

Soundtrack
Baroque Hoedown was incorporated into the finale of Light Magic.

A partial soundtrack for the show can be found on:
Disneyland/Walt Disney World Music Vacation
Disneyland/Walt Disney World: The Official Album (1997 CD)

The Light Magic theme song "Dream Our Dream" was later used in 2002 in a show called "Minnie's Birthday Surprise" at Videopolis theater in the Disneyland Park in Paris.

Production
Produced by Bruce Healey
Engineered and Mixed by Paul Freeman
Announcer: Randy Crenshaw
Dream Our Dreams Opening Play On (Vocals by Ellis Hall)
Dream Our Dreams (Vocals by Richard Page)

References

External links
Light Magic at Yesterland

Former Walt Disney Parks and Resorts attractions
Walt Disney Parks and Resorts parades
Amusement park attractions introduced in 1997
Amusement park attractions that closed in 1997
1997 in California